Oxymerus bruchi is a species of beetle in the family Cerambycidae. It was described by Gounelle in 1913.

References

Trachyderini
Beetles described in 1913